George Kee Cheung is a Hong Kong actor and stuntman with an extensive career in American television and film dating back to 1975, often playing Chinese, Japanese, Korean, Vietnamese, and Mongolian parts. His career has focused primarily on television work, though he has had numerous supporting roles in films such as Rambo: First Blood Part II, RoboCop 2, Under Siege, and Fist of the North Star.

Early life
Cheung was born in Hong Kong and earned his degree in biology at the University of San Francisco.

Career
Some notable television programs he has guest starred on include M*A*S*H; Fantasy Island; Hart to Hart; MacGyver; Magnum, P.I.; Simon & Simon; Kung Fu: The Legend Continues; The A-Team; Knight Rider; How I Met Your Mother; Seinfeld; Martial Law; Walker, Texas Ranger; Nash Bridges; NYPD Blue; ER; The West Wing; Seibu Keisatsu;  Lost and The Haves and the Have Nots.

His film appearances include Under Siege, Rambo: First Blood Part II, RoboCop 2, Lethal Weapon 4, Rush Hour, Starsky & Hutch and Mongolian Death Worm. In 2013, he voiced Wei Cheng in Grand Theft Auto V.

Filmography

Film

The Killer Elite (1975) as Bruce
The Enforcer (1976) as Mendez Henchman (uncredited)
The Kentucky Fried Movie (1977) as Guard No. 1 (segment "A Fistful of Yen")
The Amsterdam Kill (1977) as Jimmy Wong
Invisible Strangler (1978) as Medical Examiner Jim
Spider-Man: The Dragon's Challenge (1979, TV Movie) as Doctor Pai
The Exterminator (1980) as Viet Cong Commander
The Beach Girls (1982) as Wang
Going Berserk (1983) as Kung Fu Fighter
Rambo: First Blood Part II (1985) as Lieutenant Tay
Big Trouble in Little China (1986) as Chang Sing No. 6
Opposing Force (1986) as Tuan
The Night Stalker (1986) as Thug (uncredited)
Steele Justice (1987) as Mob Thug No. 3 (uncredited)
Weekend at Bernie's (1989) as Lomax's Gardener
Another 48 Hrs. (1990) as Hotel Guest
RoboCop 2 (1990) as Gilette
Guns (1990) as Sifu
The Hard Way (1991) as Drug Dealer
One Good Cop (1991) as Waiter
Fury in Red (1991) as George Chang
Showdown in Little Tokyo (1991) as Yoshida's Men (uncredited)
Ricochet (1991) as Huey, Drug Dealer (uncredited)
The Master (1992) as Paul
Death Ring (1992) as Mr. Chen
Storyville (1992) as Xang Tran
Sneakers (1992) as Chinese Restaurant Singer
Glengarry Glen Ross (1992) (voice)
Wishman (1992) as Servant No. 1
Under Siege (1992) as Commando
Cooperstown (1993, TV Movie) as Mr. Matsunaga
Joshua Tree (1993) as Chinese Gunmen No. 4
Shootfighter: Fight to the Death (1993) as Master
New York Cop (1993) as Tong
North (1994) as Chinese Barber
Deadly Target (1994) as Man No. 2
Fist of the North Star (1995) as Neville
Batman Forever (1995) as Guest (uncredited)
Galaxis (1995) as Eddie
The Adventurers (1995) as Uncle Tung
Major Payne (1995) as Vietcong Guerrilla
Police Story 4: First Strike (1996) as Chinese Group No. 1
White Tiger (1996) as Detective Fong
Carjack (1996) as Chang
True Vengeance (1997) as Hideko Minushoto
Brotherhood (1997) as Nick
High Voltage (1997) as Victor Phan
Godzilla (1998) as Japanese Fishing Boat Crewman (uncredited)
Lethal Weapon 4 (1998) as Fan
Rush Hour (1998) as Soo Yung's Driver
The Yakuza Way (1998) as Mike Sakata
Austin Powers: The Spy Who Shagged Me (1999) as Chinese Teacher
No Tomorrow (1999) as Ming
Ultimate Target (2000) as Raymond Fischer
Assassina – Codinome: Ghost (2001)
The Silent Force (2001) as Hue Gung Pao
U.S. Seals II: The Ultimate Force (2001, Direct-to-video) as Sensei Matsumura
Invincible (2001, TV Movie) as Tojo Sakamura
We Were Soldiers (2002) as NVA Officer (uncredited)
Wicked Game (2002) as Christopher
Starsky & Hutch (2004) as Chau
Sucker Free City (2004, TV Movie) as Mr. Tsing
American Fusion (2005) as Albert
Mission: Impossible III (2006) as Shanghai Game Player (uncredited)
The Pursuit of Happyness (2006) as Chinese Maintenance Worker
Rush Hour 3 (2007) as Reynard Triad Gangster (uncredited)
Blizhniy Boy: The Ultimate Fighter (2007) as Detective Ishanov
The Perfect Host (2010) as Storekeeper
Invincible Scripture (2010) as Tao Ling
Mongolian Death Worm (2010, TV Movie) as Timor
Anita Ho (2014) as Mr. Lee
Awesome Asian Bad Guys (2014) as George (2013)
Beyond the Game (2016) as Police Captain

Television

The Bionic Woman (1978) as 2nd Agent (Episode: "Rancho Outcast")
Wonder Woman (1979) as Mr. Munn (Episode: "Spaced Out")
M*A*S*H (1979) as Korean Soldier (Episode: "Guerilla my Dreams")
Magnum, P.I. (1980) as Choi (Episode: "China Doll")
T. J. Hooker (1983–1984) as Po and Dr. Coe (2 episodes)
Mickey Spillane's Mike Hammer (1984) as Chinese Triad member (Episode: "Hot Ice")
MacGyver (1985–1992) as General Narai (Episode 1.2 "The Golden Triangle")/ Troy / Dr Liang (3 episodes)
Knight Rider (1986) as Suki Taneka (Episode: "Knight Of The Rising Sun")
Saved by the Bell: The College Years (1993) as Chinese Professor (Episode: "Guess Who's Coming to College?")
Kung Fu: The Legend Continues (1993) as Chang Lu Ma (Episode: "Illusion")
Walker Texas Ranger (1994) as Manzo Tokada (Episode: "Tiger's Eye")
Murder She Wrote (1996) as Ikuma Nakata (Episode: "Kendo Killing")
Seinfeld (1997) as Owner (Episode: "The Pothole")
Mortal Kombat Conquest (1999) as Master Cho (Episode: "The Master")
ER (2003) as Mr. Chen
The West Wing (2004–2006) as China Ambassador Ling-Po (2 episodes)
How I Met Your Mother (2006) as Korean Elvis (Episode: "Nothing Good Happens After 2 A.M.")
Lost (2008) as Ambassador (Episode: "Ji Yeon")
House M.D (2012) as Xang (Episode: "Body and Soul")
Hawaii Five-0 (2016) as Yao Fat (2 episodes)

Videogames

Soldier of Fortune II: Double Helix (2002) as Huang Zhenmeng
Halo 2 (2004) as ILB: Mr. Shebura (Uncredited)
Mercenaries: Playground of Destruction (2005) as Captain Kai Leu, China Soldier
The Matrix: Path of Neo (2005) as Kung Fu Soldier, Chinatown Gangster, Additional Walla
Pirates of the Caribbean: At World's End (2007) as Sao Feng's Henchman
Enemy Territory: Quake Wars (2007) as GDF Covert Ops, Additional VO
Uncharted: Drake's Fortune (2007) as Pirates No. 1
Dead to Rights: Retribution (2010) as Lao
Grand Theft Auto V (2013) as Wei Cheng, The Local Population
Uncharted: The Nathan Drake Collection (2015) as Pirates (Archive Footage)

Other
In May 2008, Cheung was presented by California's Asian Pacific Islander Legislative Caucus with the Asian Pacific Islander Heritage Award for Excellence in Arts and Entertainment.

References

External links

Living people
American people of Chinese descent
Hong Kong emigrants to the United States
Hong Kong male film actors
Hong Kong male television actors
Hong Kong male voice actors
Hong Kong stunt performers
University of San Francisco alumni
Year of birth missing (living people)